Kristína Gavnholt (born 12 September 1988 as Kristína Ludíková) is a Czech badminton player. She competed for Czech Republic at the 2008, 2012 and 2016 Summer Olympics.

Achievements

European Junior Championships 
She was the girls' doubles champion of the 2007 European Junior Championships partnering with Belarusian player, Olga Konon. She also competed at the girls' singles, but lost at the quarter final to Konon in a 3-sets game.

Girls' doubles

BWF Grand Prix 
The BWF Grand Prix had two levels, the Grand Prix and Grand Prix Gold. It was a series of badminton tournaments sanctioned by the Badminton World Federation (BWF) and played between 2007 and 2017.

Women's singles

 BWF Grand Prix Gold tournament
 BWF Grand Prix tournament

BWF International Challenge/Series 
Women's singles

  BWF International Challenge tournament
  BWF International Series tournament
  BWF Future Series tournament

References

External links 
 

1988 births
Living people
Sportspeople from Trenčín
Czech people of Slovak descent
Czech female badminton players
Badminton players at the 2008 Summer Olympics
Badminton players at the 2012 Summer Olympics
Badminton players at the 2016 Summer Olympics
Olympic badminton players of the Czech Republic
Badminton players at the 2015 European Games
European Games competitors for the Czech Republic